Jonathan Fantini Porter is a government official and executive in the private and social sectors. He currently serves as CEO of the public-private Partnership for Central America and previously held leadership positions at the U.S. Department of Homeland Security, The White House, U.S. Congress, and McKinsey & Company.

Career 

As of 2023, Fantini Porter serves as executive director and CEO of the White House public-private Partnership for Central America. Under his tenure, the organization raised $4.2 billion in foreign direct investment, procurement, and lending and delivered programs to 5 million individuals across Environmental, social, and corporate governance programs to address the economic roots of migration in frontier and emerging markets.

He previously served as an Associate Partner at McKinsey & Company; advisor on national security and private sector engagement to the Presidential transition of Joe Biden; a White House advisor on transnational security during the Presidency of Barack Obama; as a senior congressional aide in the U.S. Congress; and Chief of Staff in the U.S. Department of Homeland Security where he oversaw management operations of a $6 billion homeland security budget supporting 22,000 personnel in 48 countries.

He has served on advisory bodies to the U.N. High Commissioner for Refugees, World Economic Forum, and Amnesty International, and as a consulting fellow at the International Institute for Strategic Studies.

Education 

Fantini Porter is a graduate of the Harvard Kennedy School of Government and Georgetown University and was awarded an Eisenhower Fellowship.

References 

Living people
Obama administration personnel
People from Los Angeles
Harvard Kennedy School alumni
Georgetown University alumni
Year of birth missing (living people)